Pascal is a masculine and feminine given name. It is a Francophone name, cognate of Italian name Pasquale, Spanish name Pascual, Catalan name Pasqual and Portuguese name Pascoal.

Pascal is common in French-speaking countries, Germany, Austria, and the Netherlands. Derived feminine forms include Pascale, Pascalle or Pascalina. Pascal is also common as a surname in France, and in Italy (in Piedmont, Aosta Valley and, as De Pascal, in Friuli-Venezia Giulia).

Pascal derives from the Latin paschalis or pashalis, which means "relating to Easter", from the Latin term for "Easter", pascha, Greek Πάσχα, from the Aramaic pasḥā (Hebrew pesach) "Passover" (since the Hebrew holiday Passover coincides closely with the later Christian holiday of Easter, the Latin word came to be used for both occasions).
The Christian given name originally derives from the meaning "one born on Easter day", or "born on Pentecost" (see below).

Variations of the given name include: Paschal, Pasqual, Pasquale, Paskal, Pascoal, Pascale, Pascha, Paschalis, Pascual, Pascoe, and Pasco.
 
The name arises in the early medieval period, in Latin spelled Paschalis. An early bearer is Antipope Paschal (fl. 687), and Pope Paschal I (d. 824).
A variant Latin form of the name is Paschasius; this is the name of the 9th-century Frankish saint Paschasius Radbertus. Peter Pascual (Petrus Paschasius, d. 1299) was a bishop and martyr of medieval Andalusia. 
Saint Pascal (or San Pasqual) refers to Paschal Baylon (1540–1592), a Spanish friar and mystic.
Baylon was born on 24 May 1540 to Aragonese peasants. His parents named him Pasqual because he was born on the day of the feast of Pentecost (not Easter), because Pentecost in Spain was known as "the Pasch (or Passover) of the Holy Ghost" at the time.
After Pascual Baylon's beatification (1618) and canonization (1690), it became common to give the name Pascal to children born on the feast day of Saint Pascal (17 May) rather than on Easter or Pentecost, or independently of the child's date of birth.

People
 Pascal Caffet (born 1962), French pastry confectioner and chocolate maker¨
 Pascal Charbonneau (born 1983), Canadian chess Grandmaster and financial analyst
 Pascal Chimbonda (born 1979), French footballer
 Pascal Covici (1885–1964), Romanian Jewish-American book publisher and editor
 Pascal Cygan (born 1974), French retired footballer
 Pascal Dozie (born 1939), Nigerian entrepreneur and businessman
 Pascal Groß (born 1991), German professional footballer
 Pascal Hitzler, German-American computer scientist
 Pascal Köpke (born 1995), German footballer
 Pascal Légitimus (born 1959), French actor, comedian and theatre director
 Pascal Obispo (born 1965), French singer-songwriter
 Pascal Olmeta (born 1961), French former football goalkeeper
 Pascal Payet (born 1963), French murderer noted for his prison escapes
 Pascal Pia, French writer, journalist, illustrator and scholar born Pierre Durand (1903–1979)
 Pascal Rogé (born 1951), French pianist
 Pascal Siakam (born 1994), Cameroonian basketball player in the National Basketball Association
 Pascal Soriot (born 1959), chief executive officer of the pharmaceutical company AstraZeneca
 Pascal Struijk (born 1999), Dutch footballer
Pascal Thévenot (born 1966), French politician
 Pascal Wehrlein (born 1994), German-Mauritian Formula E and Formula 1 driver.

Fictional characters
 Pascal, a character from the Animal Crossing series
 Pascal, a character from the action-role playing game Nier: Automata
 Pascal, a character from the action-role playing game Tales of Graces
 Pascal, Rapunzel's pet chameleon from the 2010 film Tangled
 Pascal Curious, from the Curious family from the life simulation The Sims 2
 Pascal Sauvage, a character from the spy comedy Johnny English

References

See also
 Pascal (surname)
 Pascal (disambiguation)
 Paschal (disambiguation)
 Pascha (disambiguation)
 Pasquale (disambiguation)
 Pasqual (disambiguation)
 Pascual (disambiguation)
 Pascoe
 Pasco (disambiguation)

Masculine given names
French masculine given names
German masculine given names
Dutch masculine given names